Randy Fuller (born June 2, 1970, in Griffin, Georgia) is a former professional American football player who played cornerback for six seasons for the Denver Broncos, Pittsburgh Steelers. Atlanta Falcons, and Seattle Seahawks. He is known for breaking up the "Hail Mary" pass from Jim Harbaugh intended for Aaron Bailey in the 1995 AFC Championship Game to secure the Steelers victory, sending them to their fifth Super Bowl (XXX), and their first in 16 years.

1970 births
Living people
American football cornerbacks
Denver Broncos players
Pittsburgh Steelers players
Seattle Seahawks players
Atlanta Falcons players
Tennessee State Tigers football players